In mathematics and analytic number theory, Vaughan's identity is an identity found by  that can be used to simplify  Vinogradov's work on trigonometric sums. It can be used to estimate summatory functions of the form

where f is some arithmetic function of the natural integers n, whose values in applications are often roots of unity, and Λ is the von Mangoldt function.

Procedure for applying the method

The motivation for Vaughan's construction of his identity is briefly discussed at the beginning of Chapter 24 in Davenport. For now, we will skip over most of the technical details motivating the identity and its usage in applications, and instead focus on the setup of its construction by parts.

This last expansion implies that we can write

where the component functions are defined to be

so that we can write

It is remarked that in some instances sharper estimates can be obtained from Vaughan's identity by treating the component sum  more carefully by expanding it in the form of

The optimality of the upper bound obtained by applying Vaughan's identity appears to be application-dependent with respect to the best functions  and  we can choose to input into equation (V1). See the applications cited in the next section for specific examples that arise in the different contexts respectively considered by multiple authors.

Applications

 Vaughan's identity has been used to simplify the proof of the Bombieri–Vinogradov theorem and to study Kummer sums (see the references and external links below).
 In Chapter 25 of Davenport, one application of Vaughan's identity is to estimate an important prime-related exponential sum of Vinogradov defined by

In particular, we obtain an asymptotic upper bound for these sums (typically evaluated at irrational ) whose rational approximations satisfy

of the form

The argument for this estimate follows from Vaughan's identity by proving by a somewhat intricate argument that

 Another application of Vaughan's identity is found in Chapter 26 of Davenport where the method is employed to derive estimates for sums (exponential sums) of three primes.
 Examples of Vaughan's identity in practice are given as the following references / citations in  this informative post:.

Generalizations

Notes

References

External links
  Proof Wiki on Vaughan's Identity
  Joni's Math Notes (very detailed exposition)
  Encyclopedia of Mathematics
  Terry Tao's blog on the large sieve and the Bombieri-Vinogradov theorem

Theorems in analytic number theory
Mathematical identities